Triplophysa obtusirostra is a species of ray-finned fish in the genus Triplophysa. It is endemic to Qinghai province, China, near the origin of the Yellow River.

Footnotes 

O
Freshwater fish of China
Endemic fauna of China
Fish described in 1988